Thomas Andergassen (born ) is a German male artistic gymnast, representing his nation at international competitions.  He participated at the 2004 Summer Olympics and at the 2008 Summer Olympics in Beijing, China. He also competed at world championships, including the 2006 World Artistic Gymnastics Championships and 2007 World Artistic Gymnastics Championships.

References

External links

1980 births
Living people
German male artistic gymnasts
Olympic gymnasts of Germany
Gymnasts at the 2004 Summer Olympics
Gymnasts at the 2008 Summer Olympics
20th-century German people
21st-century German people